Wing Commander Robert John Orton Compston DSC & 2 Bars DFC (9 January 1898 – 28 January 1962) was an English fighter pilot credited with 25 victories during World War I. He was one of only seven airman in this war who won three awards of the Distinguished Service Cross.

Life and service
Robert John Orton Compston was born in Farnham, Surrey the son of Herbert Fuller Bright Compston, a clergyman, and his wife Rose Contance Compston (née Orton). He joined the Royal Naval Air Service in 1915 when he was 17 years old. He originally flew Home Defense missions, but was reassigned to 8 Naval Squadron when it went to France. He was a close friend of ace Robert Little.

Compston served in the Royal Air Force in the Second World War. On the 13 August 1940, while based at RAF Detling, the airfield came under attack by the Luftwaffe. It was the first major effort of the Germans during the Battle of Britain. Junkers Ju 87Stuka dive-bombers devastated the station and Squadron Leader Compston was wounded in action; one of 42 wounded and 24 killed. He retired from the RAFVR in 1954 with the rank of wing commander.

Personal life
Compston married Nina Barclay in Chelsea in 1919. He died in the Worthing area of Sussex on 28 January 1962 aged 64.

Honours and awards
12 May 1917 Flight Lieutenant Robert John Orton Compston, R.N.A.S. was awarded the Distinguished Service Cross (DSC):

11 August 1917 Flight Commander Robert John Orton Compston, D.S.C., R.N.A.S. was awarded a bar to his Distinguished Servrtillery aeroplanes:

 
On 16 March 1918 Flight Commander Robert John Orton Compston, D.S.C., R.N.A.S. was awarded a second bar to his Distinguished Service Cross (DSC):

3 June 1918  Captain Robert John Orton, DSC was awarded the Distinguished Flying Cross on the occasion of the King's Birthday for Distinguished Service.

Sources of info

References
 Sopwith Triplane Aces of World War 1. Norman Franks. Osprey Publishing, 2004. , 9781841767284.
 Saunders, Andy. Stuka Attack!: The Dive-Bombing Assault on England During the Battle of Britain. Grub Street, London. 

Royal Naval Air Service aviators
1898 births
1962 deaths
Royal Navy officers of World War I
People from Farnham
Royal Air Force squadron leaders
British World War I flying aces
Royal Air Force Volunteer Reserve personnel of World War II
Royal Naval Air Service personnel of World War I
Military personnel from Surrey